The Next Boy/Girl Band Thailand is a Thai reality television series on the Channel 7 television network. It was premiered on 3 June 2018. The show is the Thailand version of The Next Boy/Girl Band Netherlands.
The series was licensed by the Kantana Group.

Host 
 Natthaya Boonchompaisarn (Grace The Face Thailand season 3)
 Bank Sangnimnuan (Bank The Face Men Thailand)

Producer

Season 1

Contestants

Winner

Bands 

 The Next Boyband
 The Next Girlband

References

External links 

 The Next Boy/Girl Band Thailand on IMDb

2018 Thai television series debuts
2010s Thai television series
Thai reality television series
Thai music television series
Thai-language television shows
Music competitions in Thailand
Channel 7 (Thailand) original programming